At least two warships of Japan have been named Yamagumo:

, an  launched in 1937 and sunk in 1944
, a  launched in 1965 and struck in 1995

Japanese Navy ship names